Ajita Srivastava is an Indian singer, educationist and a social worker. Srivastava is known for popularizing and promoting the Kajari folk songs, a popular form of folk music from Mirzapur and the surrounding region. She was awarded Padma Shri in 2022 by the Government of India for her contributions in the field of arts.

Life and education 
Srivastava was born in Varanasi, Uttar Pradesh. She has completed her Sangeet Prabhakar from Prayag Sangeet Samiti in Prayagraj, B. Ed. from Gorakhpur University and M. A. from Banaras Hindu University.

Later, Srivastava married Rasbihari Lal, a famous poet, writer and lawyer by profession from Mirzapur, and settled there. Her only child, Anurag Anand serves in the Indian Air Force.

Career 
Srivastava started her professional career with All India Radio Varanasi in 1980. She has been associated with and performed for various organizations including All India Radio, Lucknow Doordarshan, Sangeet Natak Akademi Uttar Pradesh, Indian Council for Cultural Relations, Ministry of External Affairs, NCZCC Prayagraj, Ministry of Tourism, Ministry of Culture, Government of Delhi, Indian Army and T-Series among others.

In 2017, she retired as a lecturer from the Arya Kanya Inter College after 40 years of teaching career. Since then, she has fully dedicated her time to preserve, promote and propagate Kajari and other folk music of the region on national and international level.

Awards 
 2022 – Padma Shri
 2021 – Vishwa Hindi Shodh Samvardhan Award
 2021 – Kajali Kokila Award
 2021 – Yogya Sikshaika evam Kajali Gayika Award
 2021, 2010 – SAARC FOSWAL Award
 2021, 2020, 2019 – Nari Shakti Puraskaar by Government of Uttar Pradesh
 2020 – Kashi Anand Samman
 2019 – Harit Uttar Pradesh, Swachch Uttar Pradesh Visisth Samman
 2019 – Kajali Karyashala Mukhya Prashikshika Award
 2017 – Namami Jagriti Samman
 2017 – Uttar Pradesh Sangeet Natak Akademi Award
 2011 – Vaishya Gaurav Samman
 2008 – Nari Shakti Samman by Amar Ujala
 1996 – Kajali Samragyi Award

References

External links 
 सावन और कजरी interview with DD Uttar Pradesh on YouTube (in Hindi)

Recipients of the Padma Shri in arts
Indian women folk singers
20th-century Indian women singers
20th-century Indian singers
Living people
Year of birth missing (living people)